The South African Railways Class DS1 of 1939 was a diesel-electric locomotive.

The second diesel-electric locomotive on the South African Railways was a single Class DS1 AEG diesel-electric shunting locomotive which was placed in service in 1939. Two of these locomotives were delivered to South Africa, one for the Railways and another for the Electricity Supply Commission.

Manufacturer
As a result of the problems experienced in obtaining adequate water supplies in the arid regions of South Africa and South West Africa, particularly on the section between De Aar in the Karoo via Upington to Keetmanshoop, the South African Railways (SAR) decided to experiment with diesel-powered traction and introduced its first two diesel-electric shunting locomotives in 1939.

The second of these was a single six-wheeled locomotive of which two units were ordered from Allgemeine Elektricitäts-Gesellschaft (AEG) in Berlin at the same time as the single Class DS locomotive.

Only one of them entered service on the SAR and was designated Class DS1. It was initially numbered D138, but it was soon renumbered to D514. Both numbers were actually in the electric locomotive number range.

The second locomotive was delivered to the Electricity Supply Commission (ESCOM), the state-owned South African national power corporation, who placed it in service in Cape Town.

Characteristics
The locomotive was powered by a Maschinenfabrik Augsburg-Nürnberg (MAN)  eight-cylinder diesel engine prime mover. An AEG  main generator and an AEG  auxiliary generator were mounted directly in line between the engine and the cab. The engine was water-cooled with a fan that was belt-driven by the engine and that drew air through a conventional radiator.

This three-axle locomotive was essentially half a Class DS locomotive. Each axle was driven by a force-ventitated axle-suspended DC traction motor and sanding was arranged at the back and front of all wheels. Its single engine compartment was identical to either one of the two engine compartments of the Class DS. The cab was also identical to that of the Class DS, equipped with mechanically interlocked dual controls to enable operation in either direction.

Service

South African Railways
The SAR Class DS1 was withdrawn from yard service in July 1956 and transferred to the SAR's Civil Engineering department, who continued to use it for shunting at the Braamfontein Electric Running Shed (ERS) in Johannesburg into the early 1960s. Since it was used to move trolleys with heavy traction motors around the workshop, the original AAR knuckle coupler was replaced by a low-mounted Johnston link-and-pin coupler and the original coupler pockets were blanked off.

When it was finally retired from service and replaced by a Class S2 shunting steam locomotive, it was plinthed on a short piece of track on the western side of the Braamfontein ERS. The picture alongside shows the locomotive at Braamfontein, with the bell coupler mounted barely above track level and with the original coupler pocket blanked off.

ESKOM
The ESKOM locomotive was initially employed by the City of Cape Town at the Table Bay Power Station. It was painted in a maroon livery and was named Citelek. It was later transferred to the Athlone Power Station in Cape Town, where it was scrapped in about 1966.

References

3280
C locomotives
Co locomotives
AEG locomotives
Cape gauge railway locomotives
Railway locomotives introduced in 1939
1939 in South Africa